Lumiar station is part of the Yellow Line of the Lisbon Metro, serving the Lumiar neighbourhood, close to Lisbon airport.

History
The station opened on 17 March 2004, along with Odivelas, Senhor Roubado, Ameixoeira and Quinta das Conchas stations, and is located on Estrada da Torre.

The architectural design of the station is by Dinis Gomes.

Connections

Urban Buses

Carris 
 206 Cais do Sodré ⇄ Senhor Roubado (Metro) (morning service)
 207 Cais do Sodré ⇄ Fetais (morning service)
 703 Charneca ⇄ Bairro de Santa Cruz
 717 Praça do Chile ⇄ Fetais
 736 Cais do Sodré ⇄ Odivelas (Bairro Dr. Lima Pimentel)
 796 Campo Grande (Metro) ⇄ Galinheiras

Autocarros Suburbanos

Rodoviária de Lisboa 
 201 Lisboa (Campo Grande) ⇄ Caneças (Escola Secundária)
 300 Lisboa (Campo Grande) ⇄ Sacavém (Praça da República)
 311 Lisboa (Campo Grande) ⇄ Bairro das Coroas (Alto do Moinho)
 312 Lisboa (Campo Grande) circulação via Charneca
 313 Lisboa (Campo Grande) circulação via Sacavém
 331 Lisboa (Campo Grande) ⇄ Bucelas
 335 Lisboa (Campo Grande) ⇄ Bucelas via Fanhões
 336 Lisboa (Campo Grande) ⇄ Bucelas via Ribas
 901 Lisboa (Campo Grande) ⇄ Caneças (Escola Secundária)
 931 Lisboa (Campo Grande) ⇄ Pontinha (Metro) via Centro Comercial

See also
 List of Lisbon metro stations

References

External links

Yellow Line (Lisbon Metro) stations
Railway stations opened in 2004